Valkenburg railway station is located in Valkenburg aan de Geul, the Netherlands. The station was opened on 23 October 1853 and is located on the Maastricht–Aachen railway. The station building is the oldest in the Netherlands.

Train services
Valkenburg station is served by Arriva with the following train services:
Express sneltrein S5: Maastricht–Heerlen
Express sneltrein : Aachen–Maastricht
Local stoptrein S4: Maastricht–Heerlen

References

Railway stations on the Heuvellandlijn
Railway stations opened in 1853
Rijksmonuments in Valkenburg aan de Geul
Railway stations in Valkenburg aan de Geul